Bob Bryan and Mike Bryan were the defending champions, but chose not to participate that year.

Marc Gicquel and Robert Lindstedt won in the final 7–6(8–6), 6–3, against Bruno Soares and Kevin Ullyett.

Seeds

Draw

Draw

External links
Draw

Doubles